Graham(e) Clark(e) may refer to:

 Graham Clarke (Australian cricketer) (1939–2006), Australian cricketer
 Graham Clark (English cricketer) (born 1993), English cricketer
 Graham Clark (Emmerdale), fictional character from British soap opera Emmerdale
 Graham Clark (EastEnders), fictional character from the British soap opera EastEnders
 Graham Clark (tenor) (born 1941), English tenor
 Graham Clark (violinist) (born 1959), British jazz violinist
 Graham Clark (footballer) (born 1961), Scottish footballer with Darlington and Montrose
 Graham Clarke (musician) (born 1970), American singer, songwriter and guitarist
 Graham Clarke (footballer) (1935–2010), English footballer with Southampton F.C.
 Graham Clarke (hurler) (born 1974), Irish hurler with Down
 Grahame Clark (1907–1995), British archaeologist
 M. Graham Clark, American educator

See also
Graeme Clark (disambiguation)